Forevermore is the eleventh studio album by British hard rock band Whitesnake, which was released on 9 March 2011 in Japan through WEA, 25 March 2011 in Europe, 29 March 2011 in the US, and 18 April 2011 in the UK and Ireland through Frontiers Records. The album was released on vinyl, in addition to the regular CD and digital editions.

A special edition of the album, called 'Snake Pack' was released in the UK only, and contains two bonus live tracks, a 132-page magazine, a pin, as well as special artwork. The two live bonus tracks are a teaser for the upcoming live album, recorded in 1990 at Donington Park (Live at Donington 1990) and released in the summer of 2011.
On iTunes the album also contains two different bonus tracks, an alternative mix of "Love Will Set You Free" and an acoustic version of "Forevermore". In addition, Amazon.com offered the album with the bonus track "My Evil Ways" on its digital store.

A digital single for the song "Love Will Set You Free" was released on 21 February 2011, while the video was released on 14 February. A free download of the song was made available on Whitesnake's Facebook page on 15 February. The single charted on the Billboard Heritage Rock charts at number 26.

Background
In 2008, Whitesnake released their first studio album in more than a decade, Good to Be Bad. The album was well-received, and charted in several countries. Whitesnake guitarist Doug Aldrich revealed that he had started coming up with song ideas for a followup in 2009, a year after Good to be Bad was released. Aldrich also noted that "David [Coverdale, Whitesnake frontman] had said that he might wanted [sic] to make a record and maybe it could be more acoustic-based."

David Coverdale has stated that he believes Forevermore is "still embracing all those elements that drew [the band's fans] to Whitesnake in the first place."

Reception

Critical
Forevermore was met with generally positive reviews upon release. Thom Jurek of AllMusic rated the album 3.5/5 and stated that "the album's first single, Love Will Set You Free, is top-notch Whitesnake that nods back to the early years while grounding itself in the present." He also stated that the tracks "All Out of Luck" and "Tell Me How" "measure up in the same way".

Commercial
The album debuted at No. 49 on Billboard 200, selling 12,000 copies in its first week. It has sold 44,000 copies in the US as of May 2015.

Tour
A world tour to promote the album was announced, and American dates listed for May and August 2011, and European dates are listed for June and July 2011. Following the release of the album, a worldwide tour began on 11 May 2011 in Westbury, New York. The North American concerts were followed by concerts in Europe, South America and Asia. The tour went to thirty-five countries. It ended on 8 December 2011 in Wolverhampton, England. Six songs from the album were performed live, namely "Steal Your Heart Away", "Love Will Set You Free", "One of These Days", "Fare Thee Well", "My Evil Ways" and "Forevermore". Two former Whitesnake band members, Adrian Vandenberg and Bernie Marsden, played as guests on four concerts.

Track listing

Personnel

Whitesnake
 David Coverdale – lead and backing vocals
 Doug Aldrich – lead and rhythm guitars, backing vocals
 Reb Beach – lead and rhythm guitars, backing vocals
 Michael Devin – bass, backing vocals
 Brian Tichy – drums, percussion

Additional personnel
 Timothy Drury – keyboards
 Jasper Coverdale - backing vocals

Production
 Produced, engineered and mixed by Los Bros Brutalos (David Coverdale, Doug Aldrich, Michael McIntyre)
 Mike Tacci - drums recording engineer
 Eric Astor - assistant engineer
 Dave Donnelly - mastering

Charts

References 

Whitesnake albums
2011 albums
Frontiers Records albums
Warner Music Group albums